Yves Delvingt (born 8 February 1953) is a French judoka. He competed at the 1976 Summer Olympics and the 1980 Summer Olympics.

References

External links
 

1953 births
Living people
French male judoka
Olympic judoka of France
Judoka at the 1976 Summer Olympics
Judoka at the 1980 Summer Olympics
Place of birth missing (living people)